"Volcano"  is a song performed by American popular music singer-songwriter Jimmy Buffett.  It was written by Jimmy Buffett, Keith Sykes, and Harry Dailey and released as a single (b/w "Stranded on a Sandbar") on MCA 41161 in November 1979.
The song was first released on his 1979 album Volcano and reached No. 66 on the Billboard Hot 100, as well as peaking at No. 43 on the Hot Adult Contemporary Tracks chart.

Background
The song was written in a calypso/reggae style, The song and album are named for the then-dormant Soufrière Hills volcano on the island of Montserrat in the British West Indies where Buffett recorded the album in May 1979 at AIR Studios. The studio was destroyed by Hurricane Hugo in 1989 and Soufrière Hills erupted again in 1995.

The lyrics describe the narrator's anxiety about his possible whereabouts following the impending eruption of a volcano. The bridge before the final chorus mentions a number of placenames, some important largely in the context of 1979: 

Cash Box said that the song "is flavorful and timely, with lots of offbeat references." Record World said that "The  ambience runs from the
pervasive percussion to the sparkling bass pipes."

"Volcano" is one of Buffett's more popular songs with fans, and is part of "The Big 8" that he has played at almost all of his concerts.  Recorded live versions of the song appear on Feeding Frenzy, Buffett Live: Tuesdays, Thursdays, Saturdays, and the video Live by the Bay.  The placenames in the final bridge are often altered in concert to reflect more recent news. The song was also re-recorded and released for Rock Band on June 3, 2008, with the last two lines listed above changed to, "I want to be a couch potato / Just play Rock Band everyday."

Popular culture
Volcano was recorded at AIR Studios in Montserrat and was played at the London benefit concert "Music for Montserrat", arranged by Sir George Martin to support the island after the twin disasters of hurricane Hugo and the eruptions of the Soufrière Hills volcano. The lyrics were changed to fit the context. For example, the phrase "We've got to help our friends in Montserrat" appeared in the song. When performed at concerts, a video of the song on Rock Band is shown.

Chart performance

References

External links
Volcano by Jimmy Buffett, Keith Sykes, and Harry Dailey

1979 singles
Jimmy Buffett songs
Songs written by Jimmy Buffett
MCA Records singles